Cave's Inn Pits is a  biological Site of Special Scientific Interest south-west of Shawell in Leicestershire.

These disused gravel workings have some of the best neutral marsh in the county, with varied habitats also including scrub, species-rich grassland and shallow pools. There are diverse species of breeding birds.

The site is private land with no public access.

References

Sites of Special Scientific Interest in Leicestershire